Shefali Alvares (born 10 December 1983) is an Indian playback singer. She has sung many popular songs such as Subah Hone Na De (Tu Mera Hero), Party On My Mind in Bollywood movies.

Early life
Shefali was born in a musical family. She is currently managed by Tarsame Mittal Talent Management for her live shows.

Film career

References

External links
 

Indian women playback singers
1983 births
Living people
Telugu playback singers
21st-century Indian women singers
21st-century Indian singers
Bollywood playback singers